The Airborne Special Service Company (ASSC), alternatively known as the Liang Shan Special Operations Company, is an elite special forces unit belonging to the Republic of China Army (Taiwan Army). The ASSC is the most elite unit in Taiwan, they are reportedly based in Taiwan Pingtung County and tasked with carrying out  special operations, including decapitation strikes in the event of a war.

Composition
The ASSC reportedly is composed of approximately 150 personnel, and was founded around 1980. It is similar to the US Army's Delta Force and the British Army's Special Air Service. It is subordinate to the Army Aviation and Special Forces Command.

See also
 Amphibious Reconnaissance and Patrol Unit
 Republic of China Military Police Special Services Company
 Thunder Squad
 List of military special forces units

References

Special forces units of the Republic of China
Army reconnaissance units and formations
Counterterrorist organizations